Édgar Eusebio Millán Gómez (1967 – 8 May 2008) was a third-ranking member of Mexico's Secretariat of Public Security and acting commissioner of the Federal Preventive Police. Born in Mexico City, he received a law degree from the Universidad del Valle de México. After graduating he started his career in the Mexican Federal Police and received training in several countries.

On 8 May 2008, at  the age of 41, Commander Millán was shot to death at his Mexico City home just after arriving at midnight. He was hit eight times in the chest and once in a hand. He died a few hours later at Metropolitan Hospital. Intelligence officials said it was highly likely that he was killed in retribution for the arrest on 21 January of Alfredo Beltrán Leyva.

His funeral was attended by the highest-ranking officials in Mexico, including President Felipe Calderón and Guillermo Galván Galván, general of the Mexican Army.

In June 2011, a federal judge sentenced his killer, Alejandro Ramirez Baez, to 60 years in prison along with an accomplice. Alejandro Ramirez Baez killed Edgar Millán Gomez on behalf of the Beltrán-Leyva Cartel.

References

1967 births
2008 deaths
Deaths by firearm in Mexico
People murdered by Mexican drug cartels
People murdered in Mexico
Chiefs of police
Male murder victims
Mexican police officers
Victims of the Mexican Drug War
Assassinated Mexican people